Aleksandar Milenković (born 22 December 1967) is a Serbian cyclist, biathlete and cross-country skier. Milenković has competed at two Winter and one Summer Olympic Games representing Yugoslavia, Independent Olympic Participants and Serbia and Montenegro.

Olympic career

1992 Winter Olympics 

At the 1992 Winter Olympics, Milenković represented Socialist Federal Republic of Yugoslavia and competed in cross-country skiing.
 10 kilometres - 87th
 30 kilometres - 80th
 50 kilometres - 65th
 10/15 kilometres Pursuit - 75th

1992 Summer Olympics 

At the 1992 Summer Olympics, Milenković competed as Independent Olympic Participant in cycling.
 Road Race - 42nd
 100 kilometres Team Time Trial - 18th

2006 Winter Olympics 

At the 2006 Winter Olympics, Milenković represented Serbia and Montenegro and competed in biathlon and cross-country skiing.

Biathlon 
 10 kilometres Sprint - 85th
 20 kilometres - 85th

Cross-country skiing 
 Men's 50 kilometres - DNF

References

1967 births
Living people
Serbian male biathletes
Serbian male cyclists
Serbian male cross-country skiers
Olympic cross-country skiers of Yugoslavia
Olympic cyclists as Independent Olympic Participants
Olympic biathletes of Serbia and Montenegro
Olympic cross-country skiers of Serbia and Montenegro
Cross-country skiers at the 1992 Winter Olympics
Cyclists at the 1992 Summer Olympics
Biathletes at the 2006 Winter Olympics
Cross-country skiers at the 2006 Winter Olympics
Sportspeople from Belgrade